François Martin may refer to:
 François Martin (navigator) (c. 1575-c. 1631), navigator
 François Martin (Pondicherry) (1634–1706), governor of French India
 François Martin (composer) (1727–1757), French composer and cellist
 Francois Xavier Martin (1762–1846), American jurist
 François Martineau (1844–1911), Canadian politician

See also
 Francis Martin (disambiguation)